Ramakrishna Cine Studios (Telugu: రామకృష్ణ సినీ స్టూడియోస్) is a film production house and studio facility located at Nacharam, Hyderabad, India. It was constructed by N. T. Rama Rao in memory of his son Rama Krishna. The first film shot in the studio was Daana Veera Soora Karna (1977).

History 
N. T. Rama Rao started Ramakrishna Cine Studio on Golkonda X Roads in 1976. It was closed and shifted to Nacharam. Currently known as Ramakrishna Horticultural Cine Studio, it has permanent sets which are suitable for shooting mythological films.

Filmography 
 Tatamma Kala (1974)
 Vemulawada Bheemakavi (1975) 
 Daana Veera Soora Karna (1977)
 Chanakya Chandragupta (1977)
 Akbar Salim Anarkali (1978)
 Sri Rama Pattabhishekam (1978)
 Driver Ramudu (1979)
 Sri Tirupati Venkateswara Kalyanam (1979)
 Anuraga Devata (1982)
 Chanda Sasanudu (1983)
 Srimadvirat Veerabrahmendra Swami Charitra (1984)
 Subhalekhalu (1998)
 NTR: Kathanayakudu (2019)
 NTR: Mahanayakudu (2019)

References

External links
 Ramakrishna Cine Studios at IMDb.

Film production companies based in Hyderabad, India
Memorials to NT Rama Rao
1976 establishments in Andhra Pradesh
Indian companies established in 1976